Given names originating from the Slavic languages are most common in Slavic countries.

The main types of Slavic names:
 Two-basic names, often ending in mir/měr (Ostromir/měr, Tihomir/měr, Němir/měr), *voldъ (Vsevolod, Rogvolod), *pъlkъ (Svetopolk, Yaropolk), *slavъ (Vladislav, Dobroslav, Vseslav) and their derivatives (Dobrynya, Tishila, Ratisha, Putyata, etc.)
 Names from flora and fauna (Shchuka - pike, Yersh - ruffe, Zayac - hare, Wolk/Vuk - wolf, Orel - eagle)
 Names in order of birth (Pervusha - born first, Vtorusha/Vtorak - born second, Tretiusha/Tretyak - born third)
 Names according to human qualities (Hrabr - brave, Milana/Milena - beautiful, Milosh - cute)
 Names containing the root of the name of a pagan deities (Troyan, Perunek/Peruvit, Yarovit, Stribor, Šventaragis, Veleslava)

History

In pre-Christian traditions, a child less than 7–10 years old would bear a "substitutional name", the purpose of which was to deflect attention from the child and thereby to protect it from the curiosity of evil powers. The practice was largely the effect of the high mortality rate for young children at the time. A child who survived to 7–10 years was considered worthy of care and was granted adult status and a new adult name during a ritual first haircut.

Traditional names remained dominant until the Slavic nations converted to Christianity. Since then, however, baptismal names came into use, which were given after the patron saint of the newly baptized. Even after that, the traditional names persisted in everyday use, while in religious matters baptismal name was involved; thus, many persons had and used two names simultaneously. This is exemplified by how the Slavic saints of that time are referred to up to nowadays: e.g. St. Boris and Gleb, in holy baptism Roman and David. As the Slavic saints became more numerous, more traditional names entered the Church calendar; but more prominent was the overall decline in the number of people bearing traditional names. Finally, in 16th–17th century the traditional Slavic names which did not enter the calendar of either Orthodox or Catholic Church generally fell out of use. For Catholic Slavs, the decisive event was the Council of Trent (1545–63) decreed that every Catholic should have a Christian name instead of a native one.

Names in Poland

After the ban on native non-Christian names imposed by the Council of Trent, the Polish nobility (especially Protestants) attempted to preserve traditional names, such as Zbigniew and Jarosław. Ordinary people, however, tended to choose names solely from the Christian calendar, which contained only a handful of Slavic saints' names, in particular: Kazimierz (St. Casimir), Stanisław (St. Stanislaus), Wacław (St. Wenceslaus) and Władysław (St. Ladislaus). Slavic names that referred to God (e.g., Bogdan, Bogumił) were also permitted.

Names in Kievan Rus'

Rus' names were based on common Slavic names such as Volodiměrŭ (Володимѣръ - "great ruler"), Svętopŭlkŭ (Свѧтопълкъ - "holy regiment"), Jęropŭlkŭ (Ѩропълкъ - "furious regiment"), Voislavŭ (Воиславъ - "glorious warrior"), Boryslavŭ (Бориславъ - "glorious fighter"), Borisŭ (Борисъ - "fighter"), Liubomirŭ (Любомиръ - "loves the peace"), Ratibor ("war fighter"), Vadim ("Вадимъ" from the Persian Badim (mendal), or Badan (belonging to the wind spirit "Badan", Yaroslav, Izyaslav ("The one who took the glory"), Mstislav ("glorious revenge"), Vsevolod ("lord of everything"). In the 11th century, after the growing influence of the Christian Church, the tendency to use the names of saints of the Greek Church has increased and most of old Rus' names were displaced by  Christian names.

Names today

Since national revivals during 19th and 20th centuries, traditional names, especially of historical rulers and heroes, regained popularity. For example, in Poland many forgotten names were resurrected, such as Bronisław, Bolesław, Dobiesław, Dobrosław, Jarosław, Mirosław, Przemysław, Radosław, Sławomir, Wiesław, Zdzisław, and Zbigniew; and new ones created, such as Lechosław and Wieńczysław. Today, traditional Slavic names are accepted by the Christian Church and are given at a child's baptism.

Meanings

Old Slavic names were built with one or two lexemes:

Single-lexeme names

Single-lexeme names were derived from ordinary or adjectival words and were usually, though not always, borne by peasants, e.g.: Baran (ram), Szydło (awl), Kąkol (cockle), Broda (beard, chin), Żyła (vein), Uchacz (ear-man), Łopata (shovel), Żaba (frog), Rus (Ruthenian/Russian man), Cich (silent man), etc. Many names of this kind are used today, for example:

Feminine
Brana (to protect)
Dobra (good)
Duša (soul)
Jagoda (berry, strawberry)
Jasna (clear, bright)
Kalina (guelder-rose)
 Lada (cadent;or: girl, maid)
Ljuba, Luba, Lyubov (love)
Mila (grace, favor)
Miluša (kind)
Mira (peace)
Nada, Nadia, Nadezhda (hope)
Slava (fame, glory)
Snežana, Snježana (snow woman)
Sobena (herself)
Sveta, Svetlana (bright, light or holy, strong)
Vera (faith)
Vesela (happy)
Vesna (spring)
Zlata (golden)
Zora (dawn)
Živa, Żywia (lively)

Masculine
Bratan, Bratko (brother)
Cvetko (flower)
Darko (gift)
Dušan, Duško (soul)
Gniewko (anger)
Goran (highlander)
Gvozden (iron)
Lech (cunning)
Leszek
Lubo, Ljuba (love)
Miloš (kind)
Miro, Mirko (peace)
Mladen (young)
Ognjen (fire)
Plamen (flame)
Prodan (sold)
Slava (fame, glory)
Veselin (happy)
Vlad (ruler)
Vuk (wolf)
Yasen (clear, bright)
Zdravko (health)
Živan, Živko (lively)

Dithematic names

Dithematic names are built with two lexemes. Kaleta 1995 notes that "In the case of Old Germanic and Old Slavic personal names, the dithematic name form contained a wish for the new-born child. These wishes pertained to the values that obtained in these early times". In Poland alone, over 600 masculine names, 120 feminine names and 150 different affixes (lexemes) are known. These have been reconstructed from place names and the (scarce) written sources such as the Bull of Gniezno. Certain names were reserved for monarchs (e.g. in Poland: Kazimierz, Władysław, Bolesław). Examples are listed below. As an example of the pattern: Władysław contains the prefix wład (to rule, ruler) and the suffix sław (fame, glory). Note that feminine equivalents usually end in a (e.g. Bogusław - Bogusława).

Participle-built names

These are derived either from the past participle (in the passive voice), e.g.: Bojan, Chocian, Kochan, Miłowan, Pomian, Stator, Wygnan, or the present participle (in the active voice), e.g.: Cieszym, Myślim, Radzim, Borzym. Such names are repositories of perhaps the largest source of sociological data about the ancient Slavic people.
They have a variety of purposes, which can be listed as follows:
 names containing a good wish, e.g. Kochan ('let him be loved'), Milan.
 names referring to affection for the new born child, e.g. Obiecan ('promised'), Żdan ('promised', 'expected'),
 names protecting from evil (consisting of lexemes with a negative, deterring effect) e.g. Wygnan, Mazan, Grozim, Niemir.
Other examples: Poznan ('known', 'recognized'), Goszczon (being a guest at someone's place), Krszczon ('baptized'), Radovan, Dragan, Željan, Dejan, Nayden, Mirjana.

Diminutive and hypocoristic names

Diminutive and hypocoristic (endearing) names deriving from the above-mentioned dithematic names are created by using different diminutive suffixes. Such names are very popular in everyday usage, and usually are created by replacing part of the name with the suffix -ek (masculine, predominantly West Slavic; e.g. Polish Włodzimierz – Włodek), -ko (masculine, predominantly South Slavic and Ukrainian), -ka (feminine; also masculine in Russian), or -a: Mila, Luba, Staszek, Radek, Władek, Zlatko, Zlata, Volodya, Bronek, Leszek, Dobrusia, Slavko, Wojtek, Mirka, Bogusia, Slava, Zdravko, Zbyszko, Miłosz, Staś, Przemek, Bolko, Draho, Željko, Borya (fight), Boško, Božica, Božana, Branko, Branka, Braniša, Borko, Budimka, Hvališa, Dobar, Dobra, Dragoš, Dragica, Dragi, Draga, Dragoş, Miloš, Slavko, Slavica, Slavisa, Svetlana, Wít, Zdenka, Bratko, Braco, Braca, Bato, Bata, Batica, etc.

Popularity in non-Slavic cultures

Some Slavic names have gained popularity in other (non-Slavic) countries, e.g.: Natasha, Nadia, Vera, Mila, Svante, Susan (Suzana), Boris, Vladimir, Mirko, Laszlo, Casimir, Wenzel, Milena, Estanislao, Vlad, Mircea, Bronislovas, Radu, Vesna, Wanda, Ladislao, Bogdan, etc.

Christian saints with Slavic names

The following list contains only canonized Saints. Beatified Saints with Slavic names (e.g. Saint Ceslaus, Saint Radim) are not included.

Names popular among Eastern Slavs

In Ukraine

Masculine

Bohdan, Bohumyl, Bozhydar, Bazhan, Boryslav, Borys, Boryslav, Bronyslav, Volodymyr, Volodyslav (Vladyslav), Viacheslav, Vseslav, Vsevolod, Vadym, Myloslav, Myroslav, Mstyslav, Mechyslav, Radym Radymyr/Radomir, Radoslav, Rostyslav, Stanyslav, Sviatopolk, Sviatoslav, Zhadan, Zorian, Tykhomyr, Liubomyr, Yaroslav, Yaromyr.

Feminine

Bohdana, Bazhana, Boleslava, Boryslava, Boronyslava, Liubomyra, Liubov, Liubava, Liudmyla/Liudmylla, Myloslava, Myroslava, Mechyslava, Nadiia, Slava, Zoriana, Zoreslava, Snizhana, Stanyslava, Svitlana, Volodymyra, Vira, Volodyslava, Yaroslava

In Russia

Masculine

Bogdan, Boleslav, Borislav, Bronislav, Kazimir, Iziaslav, Miloslav, Miroslav, Mstislav, Radimir/Radomir, Radoslav, Rostislav, Stanislav, Svyatopolk, Svyatoslav, Vadim, Vlad, Vladimir, Vladislav, Vsevolod, Vyacheslav, Yaroslav

Feminine

Bogdana, Boleslava, Borislava, Bronislava, Lyubov, Lyudmila, Miloslava, Miroslava, Nadezhda, Rada, Radoslava, Slava, Snezhana, Stanislava, Svetlana, Vera, Vladislava, Yaroslava

Names popular among Southern Slavs

In Bulgaria

Feminine

Albena, Beloslava, Bilyana, Bisera, Bistra, Blaga, Blagorodna, Blagovesta, Blaguna, Bogdana, Boryana, Borislava, Boyana, Boyka, Bozhana, Bozhidara, Branimira, Darina, Denitsa, Desislava, Dobra, Dobryana, Dobrinka, Dobromira, Dragana, Elka, Grozda, Grozdana,  Iskra, Iva, Ivayla, Ivelina, Kalina, Krasimira, Kosara, Lyuba, Lyubomira, Lyudmila, Lyubka, Lyubov, Malina, Miglena, Mila,  Militsa, Milka , Milanka, Milena, Mira, Miriana, Mirolyuba, Miroslava, Nadezhda, Nadia, Neda, Nedelya, Nedyalka, Nevena, Ognyana, Plamena, Preslava, Prolet, Rada, Radina, Radka, Radost, Radostina, Radoslava, Radosveta, Ralitsa, Rositsa, Rostislava, Rumena, Rumyana, Slavena, Slavina, Slavka, Snezha, Snezhana, Snezhanka, Snezhina, Spasena, Spaska, Stanimira, Stanislava, Stanka, Stilyana, Stoyanka, Stoyna, Svetla, Svetlana, Svetoslava, Svetozara, Svilena, Tsveta, Tsvetanka, Tsvetelina, Tsvetomira, Tsviata, Velika, Velislava, Velizara, Velmira, Vera, Vesela, Veselina, Vyara, Vihra, Vladislava, Zdravka, Vyara, Zhivka, Zlata, Zlatina, Zora, Zorka, Zornitsa

Masculine

Biser, Blago, Blagoy, Blagovest, Blagun, Bogdan, Bogomil, Bojidar, Boril, Boris, Borislav, Borko, Boyan, Boyko, Bozhidar, Bozhil, Bozhin, Branimir, Darin, Darko, Delcho, Delyan, Denislav, Desislav, Deyan, Dragan, Dragomir, Dobri, Dobrin, Dobrolyub, Dobromir, Dobroslav, Goran, Grozdan, Iskren, Ivaylo, Kalin, Kamen, Kliment, Krasimir, Krastan, Krastyo, Lachezar, Lyuben, Lyubomir, Lyuboslav, Lyudmil, Malin, Milan, Milcho, Milen, Milko, Mirko, Miro, Miroslav, Mladen, Momchil, Naum, Nayden, Nedelcho, Nedyalko, Ognian, Ognyan, Orlin, Parvan, Plamen, Preslav, Radi, Radko, Radomir, Radoslav, Radosvet, Radoy, Raicho, Rayko, Razvigor, Rosen, Rostislav, Rumen, Sneg, Slav, Slavcho, Slavi, Slavyan, Slavko, Slavomir, Spas, Stanimir, Stanislav, Stanko, Stoil, Stoyan, Stoycho, Stoyko, Strahil, Svetlin, Svetoslav, Svetozar, Svilen, Tihomir, Tomislav, Traicho, Traiko, Tsvetan, Tsvetomir, Tsvetozar, Valko, Varban, Velichko, Veliko, Velin, Velislav, Velizar, Velko, Ventseslav, Ventsislav, Veselin, Vesselin, Vihren, Vitomir, Vladimir, Vladislav, Volen, Yasen, Yavor, Zdravko, Zhelyazko, Zhivko, Zlatan, Zlatko, Zlatomir, Zvezdelin

In Croatia

Feminine

Berislava, Biserka, Blaga, Blagica, Blaženka, Bogdana, Bogomila, Bogumila, Borka, Borislava, Božena, Božica, Božidarka, Branimira, Branka, Buga, Cvita, Cvijeta, Čedna, Danica, Davorka, Divna, Dragana, Dragica, Draženka, Dubravka, Dunja, Hrvatina, Hrvoja, Hrvojka, Jasenka, Jasna, Ljuba, Ljubica, Mila, Milica, Miljenka, Mislava, Mira, Mirka, Mirna, Mojmira, Morana, Nada, Neda, Nediljka, Nevenka, Ognjenka, Ranka, Rašeljka, Ratka, Ruža, Ružica, Sanja, Slava, Slavica, Slavenka, Smiljana, Spomenka, Srebrenka, Stanislava, Stana, Stanka, Snješka, Snježana, Sunčana, Sunčica, Svitlana, Svjetlana, Tjeha, Tihana, Tihomila, Tuga, Vedrana, Vera, Verica, Vjera, Vesna, Vjekoslava, Vlasta, Vlatka, Zdenka, Zlata, Zora, Zorica, Zorka, Zrinka, Zrina, Zvjezdana, Zvonimira, Zvonka, Željka, Živka

Masculine

Berislav, Berivoj, Blago, Bogdan, Bogumil, Bogoljub, Bogomil, Boris, Borislav, Borna, Božetjeh, Božidar, Božo, Bratislav, Budimir, Branimir, Brajko, Branko, Braslav, Bratoljub, Cvitko, Cvjetko, Časlav, Častimir, Čedomir, Dalibor, Damir, Darko, Davor, Davorin, Davorko, Desimir, Dobroslav, Dobrovit, Domagoj, Dragan, Drago, Dragoslav, Dragutin, Dražan, Dražen, Draženko, Držiha, Držislav, Godemir, Gojko, Gojislav, Gojslav, Goran, Grubiša, Hrvatin, Hrvoj, Hrvoje, Hrvoslav, Kazimir, Kažimir, Jasenko, Klonimir, Krešimir, Krešo, Krševan, Lavoslav, Ljubomir, Ljudevit, Milan, Mile, Milivoj, Milovan, Miljenko, Mirko, Miro, Miroslav, Miroš, Mislav, Mladen, Mojmir, Mutimir, Nediljko, Nedjeljko, Nenad, Neven, Njegomir, Njegovan, Ognjen, Ostoja, Ozren, Predrag, Pribislav, Prvan, Prvoslav, Prvoš, Radimir, Radomir, Radoš, Rajko, Ranko, Ratimir, Ratko, Rato, Radovan, Radoslav, Siniša, Slaven, Slaviša, Slavoljub, Snješko, Slavomir, Smiljan, Spomenko, Srebrenko, Srećko, Stanislav, Stanko, Strahimir, Svetoslav, Tihomil, Tihomir, Tješimir, Tomislav, Tomo, Tugomir, Tvrtko, Trpimir, Vatroslav, Većeslav, Vedran, Velimir, Veselko, Vidoslav, Vjekoslav, Vjenceslav, Višeslav, Vitomir, Vjeran, Vladimir, Vlado, Vlatko, Vojmil, Vojmir, Vojnomir, Vuk, Zdenko, Zdeslav, Zdravko, Zorislav, Zoran, Zrinko, Zrinoslav, Zlatko, Zvonimir, Zvonko, Želimir, Željko, Živko

In North Macedonia

Feminine

Angela, Angelina, Angja, Ankica, Biljana, Bisera, Bistra, Blaga, Blagica, Blagorodna, Verka, Vladica, Denica, Živka, Zlata, Jagoda, Letka, Ljupka, Mila, Mirjana, Mirka, Rada, Radmila, Slavica, Slavka, Snežana, Stojna, Ubavka

Masculine

Blagoj, Boban, Čedomir Cvetan,  Dragan, Dragi, Duško, Goran, Ljupčo,  Slavčo, Milan, Mile, Miroslav, Vladimir, Vlatko, Zlatko, Živko, Stojan, Zlate, Mirko, Ljuben, Zoran, Ognen, Rade

In Serbia

Feminine

Blagica, Biljana, Biserka, Bojana, Bogdana, Borislava, Boža, Božana, Božena, Božica, Božidarka, Branimira, Branka, Brankica, Branislava, Budislavka, Daliborka, Dana, Danka, Danica, Dara, Darina, Darka, Davorka, Dejana, Divna, Draga, Dragana, Dragica, Dragoslava, Draženka, Dubravka, Dunja, Dušana, Goranka, Gorana, Jasna, Jadranka, Jadrana, Jasenka, Jugoslava, Krešimira, Ljubica, Kalina, Malina, Mila, Milena, Milana, Milica, Milja, Miljana, Milka, Mira, Miroslava, Mirna, Mladenka, Nada, Nadežda, Neda, Nevena, Nevenka, Navenka, Nedeljka, Rada, Radmila, Ranka, Raja, Rajana, Rajka, Radomira, Radoslava, Ružica, Ruža, Sana, Snežana, Slava, Slavica, Slavka, Stana, Senka, Stanka, Stojana, Smiljana, Stanislava, Svetlana, Lana, Ljubica, Tara, Tija, Tijana, Tomislava, Vida, Vedrana, Vera, Verica, Vjera, Vesna, Vesela, Višnja, Zvezdana, Zlata, Zorana, Zorica, Željka

Masculine

Bajko, Beloš, Beriša, Biljan, Boban, Blagoje, Bogdan, Bogomil, Bogoljub, Bojan, Borislav, Bora, Boris, Borisav, Boško, Branimir, Branislav, Branko, Brajko, Božidar, Budimir, Čedomir, Cvijetin, Gojko, Darko, Dare, Darin, Daro, Dalibor, Damir, Dane, Danko, Davor, Davorin, Dejan, Divan, Dobrica, Dobroslav, Dragan, Dragiša, Drago, Dragoljub, Dragomir, Dragoslav, Dragutin, Draža, Dražen, Draženko, Dubravko, Dušan, Duško, Gojko, Goran, Gradimir, Gvozden, Jakša, Jadranko, Jadran, Javor, Jasen, Jasenko, Jug, Jugoslav, Ljuba, Ljubo, Ljubomir, Ljubodrag, Kalin, Miladin, Milan, Milen, Miljan, Milivoje, Mile, Milenko, Milanko, Milo, Miloje, Milorad, Miloš, Milovan, Milutin, Mijomir, Miodrag, Miro, Miroslav, Mirko, Mislav, Miša, Mladen, Momčilo, Momir, Nado, Nebojša, Neven, Nedeljko, Novak, Nemanja, Nenad, Njegomir, Obren, Obrad, Ognjen, Ostoja, Ozren, Predrag, Rade, Radoš, Radič, Radivoje, Rado, Radoje, Radomir, Radonja, Ratomir, Radiša, Radmilo, Radoslav, Radosav, Radovan, Rajan, Rajko, Rajke, Rajo, Ranko, Ratko, Spas, Spasoje, Sava, Savo, Svetlan, Senko, Siniša, Srećko, Smiljan, Slava, Slaven, Slavko, Slavimir, Slaviša, Slobodan, Srđan, Srećko, Sredoje, Sreten, Stanko, Stanislav, Strahinja, Stracimir, Svetozar, Sokol, Tihomir, Tijan, Tomislav, Toplica, Vedran, Velibor, Velimir, Veljko, Veran, Veselin, Veselko, Vladimir, Vladislav, Vlastimir, Vitomir, Vlade, Vlado, Vlatko, Vojislav, Vojkan, Vojmir, Vidak, Vid, Vuk, Vukan, Vukašin, Vujadin, Vujasin, Vukosav, Vukota, Vuksan, Zvezdan, Zdravko, Zoran, Zvonko, Žarko, Željko, Želimir, Zlatan, Zlatko, Živadin, Živko, Živojin, Živorad, Života

In Slovenia

Feminine

Bogdana, Branka, Cvetka, Danica, Draga, Dragica, Dunja, Janina, Jasna, Ljuba, Ljubica, Milena, Milica, Mira, Morana, Mora, Nada, Neda, Nedeljka, Neva, Nevenka, Slava, Slavica, Spomenka, Stanislava, Stana, Stanka, Svetlana, Vedrana, Vera, Vesna, Vlasta, Vojka, Zdenka, Zdravka, Zlatka, Zora, Zorica, Zorka, Zvonka, Živa

Masculine

Bogdan, Boris, Borut, Bojan, Božidar, Božo, Branko, Ciril, Cvetko, Črtomir, Dejan,  Dragan, Drago, Dragotin, Dušan, Gojmir, Gorazd, Gregor, Jaroslav, Kresnik, Lado, Milan, Miran, Mirko, Miroslav, Miško, Perun, Radivoj, Rajko, Srečko, Slavko, Stanislav, Stanko, Stane, Vekoslav, Venceslav, Vitan, Vitomir, Vladimir, Vlado, Vojteh, Zdenko, Zdravko, Zoran, Žarko, Željko, Živko

Names popular among Western Slavs

In Poland

Feminine

Bogna,
Bogdana,
Bogumiła,
Bogusława,
Bolesława,
Bożena,
Bronisława,
Czesława,
Dąbrówka, Dobrochna,
Dobroniega,
Dobrosława,
Gniewomira,
Godzimira,
Godzisława,
Gorzysława,
Grzymisława,
Kazimiera,
Ludmiła,
Marzanna,
Mieczysława,
Milena, Miła, Mira,
Mirosława, Radochna,
Radosława,
Sławomira,
Sobiesława,
Stanisława,
Sulisława,
Velina,
Wacława,
Wiesława, Władysława,
Zdzisława

Masculine

Bogdan,
Bogumił,
Bogusław, Bogusz,
Bohdan,
Bolesław,
Bożydar,
Bronisław,
Chwalibóg,
Chwalisław,
Czcibor,
Czesław,
Dobiegniew,
Dobiesław,
Dobrogost,
Dobromir,
Dobromił,
Dobrosław,
Domard,
Domasław,
Dzierżysław, Gniewko,
Gniewomir,
Godzimir,
Godzisław,
Gorzysław,
Jarosław, Krzesimir,
Kazimierz,
Lech, Lechosław, Lesław, Leszek,
Lubomir,
Ludomił,
Mieszko,
Mieczysław,
Miłosław, Miłosz,
Mirosław,
Mścisław,
Mściwój,
Przemysław,
Przybysław,
Radosław,
Rościsław,
Sambor,
Sędziwoj, Sławoj,
Sławomir,
Sobiesław,
Stanisław,
Sulisław,
Świętosław,
Wacław,
Wiesław,
Wińczysław,
Władysław,
Włodzimierz,
Wojciech,
Wszebor,
Zawisza,
Zbigniew, Zbyszko,
Zdzisław, Ziemowit

In Slovakia and Czech Republic

Feminine

Blahoslava, Blahuše,	
Bojana, Bojka,
Boleslava, Bolena, Bolerka,	
Bohumira,
Bohuslava,
Božidara, Boža, Božena, Božka,	
Bratislava,	
Břetislava, Břetka, Břetička,
Bronislava/Branislava, Brana, Branka, Broňa, Bronička, Bronka,	
Dobrali,	 	
Dobromila,
Dobromíra,
Dobroslava,
Drahomíra, Draha, Drahuše, Drahuška, Draža, Dušana, Duša, Dušička, Duška, Sudana, Sudanka,	
Jarka, Jaroslava,
Květoslava, Kvetoslava, Kveta, Květa, Kvetka, Květka, Kvetuša, Květuše, Kvetuška, Květuška,	
Libera, Líba, Libenka, Libuše, Libuška,	
Lidmila, Ludmila, Ľudmila, Lida, Lidka, Liduna, Lidunka, Liduše, Lizuška,	
Ľubomíra, Ľuba, Ľubena, Ľubina, Ľubina, Ľubka, Ľubuška,	
Mečislava, Melina, Mecka, Mila,	
Milena, Milada, Milady, Miladena, Milana, Mlada, Mladena, Mladěna, Miladka, Milanka, Milenka, Milka, Miluše, Miluša, Miluška, Mlaška, Mladuška,	
Miloslava,
Miroslava, Mira, Mirka, Miruška,	
Nadežda, Naděžda, Nadeja, Neda,	
Pribislava, Pribena, Přibyslava, Próbka, Pribuška,	
Radmila, Radomila, Rada, Radlinka,	
Radoslava, Rada,
Rostislava, Rosta, Rostina, Rostinka, Rostuška,	
Sobeslava, Soběslava, Sobena, Sobeška,	
Stanislava, Stana, Stanička, Stanuška,	
Svetlana, Světlana, Svetla, Svetlanka, Světlanka, Svetluše, Světluše, Svetluška, Světluška,		
Veleslava, Vela, Velina, Velinka, Velka, Veluška,	
Venceslava/Vaclava, Věnceslava/Václava, Vena, Věna, Venka, Věnka, Venuška,	
Vera, Věra, Vierka, Verka, Věrka, Veruška, Věruška,	
Vladimíra, Vladmira,
Vladislava/Ladislava, Valeska,	
Vlasta,	 	
Zbyhneva, Zbyhněva, Zbyna, Zbyša, Zbyhneka, Zbyhneuška,	
Zdenka,	 	
Zdeslava, Zdislava, Desa, Zdeska, Zwisa, Zdiska,	
Zelislava,
Žitomíra, Žitka, Žituše,	
Živanka, Živka, Živuše, Živuška,
Zlata, Zlatina, Zlatinka, Zlatka, Zlatuje, Zlatuše, Zlatuška, Zlatana, Zlatunka,	
Zoila,	 	
Zora, Zorah

Masculine

Blahoslav (house form, Blahoš, Blahošek)
Bohdan,
Bohumil,
Bohumír,
Bohuslav,
Bojan, Bujanek, Bojek,
Boleslav, Bolek,	
Bořivoj (house form: Bora, Borik, Borek),	 	
Bozidar,
Bratislav,
Bretislav (house form: Bretik, Břeťa), Bronislav/Branislav, Branek, Branik, 	
Budislav, Budek,
Česlav/Ctislav,
Ctibor,	
Dalibor,	
Dobromil,	 	
Dobromir,	 	
Dobroslav,	 	
Drahomir, Draha, Drahoš, Drahošek,
Ďurko,	 	
Sudan, Sudanek, Dušan, Dušek,		
Jaroslav (house form: Jarek, Jaroušek),	
Jaromil,	
Jaromir (house form: Jarek),
Jaropluk,	
Jaroslav,		 	
Kvetoslav, Karel,	 	
Ľubomír, Ľubor, Lumír, Ľubek, Ľuborek (house form: Ľuboš, Ľubošek),
Ludomir,	
Ľudoslav,	
Mecislav, Mecek, Mecik, Mecislavek,
Milan, Milič,
Miloslav, Milda, Milon, Miloš,
Miroslav, Mirek,	
Mstislav,
Nepomuk, Pomuk, Nepomucek,	
Přemysl, Myslik, Premek,
Pribislav, Priba, Pribik, Pribišek, Radoslav (house form: Radek, Radik, Radeček, Radan, Radko, Radoš, Radoušek, slovak form: Radko), Radomír/Radimír, Radim,
Radoslav,
Rostislav, Rosta, Rostek, Rostiček, Rostik,	
Slavomir, Slava, Slavoj,	
Sobeslav, Sobek, Sobik,	
Stanislav, Stana, Standa, Stanek, Stanko, Staníček, Stanik, Svätomír,	 	
Svätopluk,
Svätoslav,
Techomír,
Techoslav,
Veleslav, Vela, Velek, Veloušek,
Venceslav/Vaclav, Vacek, Vašek, Vena, Venoušek, Wenzel,	
Vladimír,
Vladislav/Ladislav, Vlad,	
Vlastimil,	 	
Vojtech (house form: Vojta, Wojtek, Vojtik, Vojtíšek),	
Zbyhnev, Zbyna, Zbytek,	
Želislav, Želek, Želiček, Želik, Želoušek,
Zdeslav, Zdislav, Zdik Zdišek,	
Zitomir, Zitek, Zitoušek,
Živan, Živanek, Živek, Živko,
Zlatan, Zlatek, Zlatiček, Zlatik, Zlatko, Zlatoušek

Slavic names popular in Upper Sorbian Łužica 

Feminine

Božena, Dobysława, Lubina, Ludmila, Měrana, Milena, Milenka, Mječisława, Rodźisława, Wojćisława

Masculine

Bohuměr, Bronisław, Česćiměr, Dobysław, Horisław, Jaroměr, Milan, Mirko, Mirosław, Mječisław, Radoměr, Stanij, Stanisław, Wjeleměr, Wójsław

Slavic names in Kashubia 
Feminine
Sławina, Sulësława, Witosława

Masculine
Jaromir, Mscëwòj, Subisłôw, Swiãtopôłk

See also 
 Eastern Slavic naming customs
Ashkenazi Jewish name
 Slavic name suffixes
 Czech name
 Russian name
 Polish name
 Slovak name
 Ukrainian name
 Outline of Slavic history and culture

References

Literature 

 A.Cieślikowa (red.) Słownik etymologiczno-motywacyjny staropolskich nazw osobowych t.1, Kraków 2000,  
 A.Cieślikowa Derywacja paradygmatyczna w staropolskiej antroponimii, Kraków 1991,  
 A. Brückner Słownik etymologiczny języka polskiego, Warszawa 1985 
 M. Malec Imię w polskiej antroponimii i kulturze, Kraków 2001,  
 M. Malec, Obraz rodziny w słowiańskich imionach złożonych, [w:] Rozprawy slawistyczne nr 16, * Słowiańskie composita antroponimiczne, Lublin 2000

Notes

External links 

 Slavic origin names

 Slavonic names for boys
 Slavonic names for girls
 Vladimíra Darvašová, Slovanská antroponymie v zrcadle etymologie, Bachelor thesis, Masaryk University 2008 

 Czech and Slovak given names of Slavic origin
 Czech and Slovak given names
 Jména osob, 

 Croatian, Montenegrin and Serbian names of Slavic origin
 Early Croatian given names
 Masculine Serbian names
 Serbian and Croatian given names

 Polish names of Slavic origin
 Encyklopedia staropolska 
 Polish Slavic given names 
 Slavic origin names 
 Slavic First Names Explained 

 Bulgarian names of Slavic origin
 Bulgarian given names

 Russian names of Slavic origin
 Slavic names 
 Russian Personal Names: Name Frequency in the Novgorod Birch-Bark Letters By Masha Gedilaghine Holl

 
Name
 Name
 Name
Slavic culture
Names by culture